This article lists events from the year 2001 in The Bahamas.

Incumbents 
 Monarch: Elizabeth II
 Governor-General: Sir Orvile Turnquest (until November 13); Dame Ivy Dumont (Acting from November 13 until December 31)
 Prime Minister: Hubert Ingraham

Events

August
August 25 - Abaco Islands plane crash

Deaths

See also
List of years in the Bahamas

References

2000s in the Bahamas
Years of the 21st century in the Bahamas
Bahamas
Bahamas